Murphy Branch is a stream in the U.S. state of Iowa. It is a tributary to the Des Moines River.

Murphy Branch was named after Isaac Murphy, an early settler.

References

Rivers of Iowa
Rivers of Boone County, Iowa
Rivers of Dallas County, Iowa